The International Society of Dynamic Games (ISDG) is an international non-profit, professional organization for the advancement of the theory of dynamic games.

History
The ISDG was founded on August 9, 1990 in Helsinki, Finland, at the site of the 4th International Symposium on Dynamic Games and Applications in the Helsinki University of Technology. ISDG is governed by an executive board chaired by a president. The first president of the society was professor Tamer Başar. In past years the presidents of ISDG were
 Tamer Başar 1990-1994
 Alain Haurie 1994-1998
 Pierre Bernhard 1998-2002
 Georges Zaccour 2002-2006
 Geert Jan Olsder 2006-2008
 Leon Petrosyan 2008-2012
 Michèle Breton 2012-2016
 Vladimir Mazalov 2016-2022
 Florian Wagener 2022-

The objectives of ISDG
 to promote and foster the development and applications of the theory of dynamic games. 
 to disseminate scientific information through all conveniently adopted support services. ISDG achieves these goals by organizing or co-organizing symposia, conferences and workshops and publishing distinguished high-standard journals
 to establish links with the international scientific community and in particular with other societies dealing with game theory, optimization, decision analysis and dynamical systems.

ISDG publications
 Annals of the International Society of Dynamic Games (series ed.: Tamer Başar; published by Birkhäuser)
 Dynamic Games and Applications (editor-in-chief: Georges Zaccour; published by Birkhäuser)
 International Game Theory Review (managing editor: David W. K. Yeung, editors: Hans Peters, Leon A. Petrosyan; published by World Scientific Publishing Co. Pte. Ltd.)

The Isaacs Award
The executive board of the International Society of Dynamic Games decided in 2003 to establish a prize to recognize the "outstanding contribution to the theory and applications of dynamic games" of two scholars at each of its symposium, starting in 2004. The prize was named after Rufus Isaacs, the acknowledged founding father of differential games. The recipients of this prize are:
 2004: Yu-Chi Ho & George Leitmann
 2006: Nikolay Krasovskii & Wendell Fleming
 2008: Pierre Bernhard & Alain Haurie
 2010: Tamer Başar & Geert Jan Olsder
 2012: Steffen Jørgensen & Karl Sigmund
 2014: Eitan Altman & Leon Petrosyan
 2016: Martino Bardi & Ross Cressman
 2018: Andrzej Nowak & Georges Zaccour
 2022: Pierre Cardaliaguet & Mabel Tidball

References

External links

 Game Theory Society
 ISDG. Russian Chapter

Game theory
International professional associations